Nehme, also spelled Naameh, Nima, or Naama, is an Arabic word meaning "blessing" or "grace", and may refer to:

People
Nehme (given name), an Arabic given name
Nehme (surname), a Lebanese surname

Other uses
Na'ameh, a Lebanese town
Naameh, an Iranian village
Nehmeh, a Qatari company

See also 

 Kafr Ni'ma, a Palestinian town
 Naama Bay, an Egyptian natural bay
 Nameh Beyt Hardan, an Iranian village
 Nimatullah, a male Muslim given name